Alpha Richard Diounkou Tecagne (born 10 October 2001) is a Senegalese professional footballer who plays as a centre-back for Spanish team Barcelona Atlètic, on loan from Granada.

Career
Diounkou began playing football with the youth academy of Son Cladera at the age of 6, before moving to Mallorca's youth academy at the age of 14. He moved to Manchester City's youth academy in January 2016. He worked his way up their reserves, before transferring to Granada on 31 August 2021. He joined San Fernando on loan for the first half of the 2021–22 season. On 31 January 2021, he joined Barcelona B for the remainder of the season.

International career
Diounkou was born in Senegal and moved to Spain at a young age. He represented the Spain U17s at the 2018 UEFA European Under-17 Championship. He switched to represent the Senegal U20s at the 2019 FIFA U-20 World Cup. Diounkou was called up to the senior Senegal national team in May 2022 for 2023 Africa Cup of Nations qualification matches.

References

External links
 
 
 

2001 births
Living people
People from Casamance
Senegalese footballers
Senegal youth international footballers
Spanish footballers
Spain youth international footballers
Senegalese emigrants to Spain
Naturalised citizens of Spain
Spanish people of Senegalese descent
Spanish sportspeople of African descent
Granada CF footballers
San Fernando CD players
FC Barcelona Atlètic players
Primera Federación players
Association football fullbacks
Senegalese expatriate footballers
Senegalese expatriate sportspeople in England
Spanish expatriate footballers
Spanish expatriate sportspeople in England
Expatriate footballers in England